Murton is a small village and civil parish in the Eden District of Cumbria, England. The parish had a population of 330 in 2001, rising to 360 at the 2011 Census. Settlements within the parish include the villages of Hilton, Langton, Brackenber and various small farms, houses and cottages. The town of Appleby-in-Westmorland is to the south-west.

Geography 
Murton is located 200 metres west of the foot of Murton Pike. The village covers an area roughly measuring 6.88ha. A small stream known as Murton Beck runs through the village and down Murton Gill (a small woodland on the west side of the village). The stream continues west through Flakebridge wood before joining up with Keisley Beck. A kilometre south of Murton lies Hilton village and the streams of Hilton Beck and Stannerstones Sike. 1.6 km to the east is Brackenber, which lies west of George Gill and Lycum Sike.

Parts of Murton Fell lie within the British Army’s Warcop Training Area. South of Murton Pike lies Mickle Fell and Roman Fell, both of which are also part of the Warcop Training Area.

History  
The settlement of Murton is hundreds of years old, dating from at least the 1300s. Joan Blaeu’s 1646 map, "Westmorlandia Comitatvs Anglice Westmorland" mentions a village by the name of "Morton" in the present area of Murton, a "Morton Pike" is also marked on the map. Christopher Saxton’s 1579 map marks "Morton" as well as a village known as "Helton" (probably referring to Hilton) and "Lanton". Murton Hall (marked as "Morton Hall" on past maps) is a grade II listed 14th century building located in the heart of Murton, it is believed that Murton Hall was one of if not the first settlement or building in Murton.

See also

Listed buildings in Murton, Cumbria

References

External links
 Cumbria County History Trust: Murton (nb: provisional research only – see Talk page)
The Pennine Villages of the Eden Valley, and the North Pennines www.visitcumbria.com

 
Villages in Cumbria
Civil parishes in Cumbria
Eden District